11B may refer to :
 WASP-11b, an extrasolar planet discovered in 2008
 GCR Class 11B, a class of British 4-4-0 steam locomotive
 Ontario Highway 11B
 New Hampshire Route 11B
 New York State Route 11B
 802.11b, an IEEE standard for wireless networking
 Boron-11 (11B), an isotope of boron
 The U.S. Army Military Occupational Specialty code for an enlisted infantry soldier – phonetically pronounced "Eleven Bravo"
 U.S. Federal Rule of Civil Procedure 11(b), providing for sanctions against attorneys who bring frivolous lawsuits

See also
 11B-X-1371, an Internet viral video
 Stalag XI-B, a German Army POW camp near Fallingbostel
 B11 (disambiguation)